Beyond the Devil's Teeth is a travel book by Anglo-Afghan author, Tahir Shah. The text was published in April 1995 by Octagon Press.

Overview
Forty-five million years ago, Gondwanaland split apart to form India, Africa and South America. Spellbound by the ancient myth of the Gonds who inhabited a fragment of the supercontinent, Tahir Shah decided to follow their path through India and Pakistan, to Uganda and Rwanda, Kenya and Liberia, before crossing the Atlantic Ocean for Brazil, and the Patagonian glaciers.

Roughing it for most of the journey, Shah shared his travels and his tales with a mix of eccentric and entertaining characters, from Osman and Prideep, Mumbai's answer to Laurel and Hardy, to Oswaldo Rodiguez Oswaldo, a well-turned-out Patagonian.

Release
Beyond the Devil's Teeth was Shah's first mainstream travel book. Although received well by the critics, it is less crafted as his later works, such as The Caliph's House and In Arabian Nights. In a note on his own website, Shah describes how he set up his own agency called Worldwide Media Limited—and masqueraded as an agent called William Watkins—in order to sell the book: it was a ruse that worked. The book sold to the distinguished British publisher Weidenfeld and Nicolson, and paved the way for a host of other works.

Reviews
 Review of Beyond the Devil's Teeth on ShiaChat
 Review of Beyond the Devil's Teeth on Wordsbody

References

External links
 Beyond the Devil's Teeth on Author Website

1997 non-fiction books
British travel books
Books by Tahir Shah
Weidenfeld & Nicolson books
English non-fiction books